Eero Kinnunen may refer to:
 Eero Kinnunen (Estonian military personnel) (born 1967), Estonian military personnel
 Eero Kinnunen (Finnish military personnel), Finnish flying ace in WW II
 Eero Kinnunen, Finnish entrepreneur (1932–2005) (:fi)